The 14th Standing Committee of the Supreme People's Assembly (SPA) was elected by the 1st Session of the 14th Supreme People's Assembly on 11 April 2019. It was named 14th Presidium until sometime in 2021 when the body's name was changed to the current one.

Meetings
 1st–10th not made public.
 11th Plenary Meeting (4 November 2020) 
 12th Plenary Meeting (4 December 2020)
 13th Plenary Meeting (4 March 2021)

Members

References

Citations

Bibliography
Books:
 

14th Supreme People's Assembly
Presidium of the Supreme People's Assembly
2019 establishments in North Korea